Gabriel 'Gabe' Davies is a British big-wave surfer.

Surf career
Gabe is a four-time British surfing champion and big wave surfer from Newcastle, UK.  He has appeared in award-winning surfing documentaries such as Joel Conroy's Eye of the Storm in 2002 and in 2009 he co-lead with Richie Fitzgerald in Joel Conroy's first featured documentary, Waveriders. Together they tow surfed the biggest swell ever ridden off the Irish Atlantic Coast for which Gabe was nominated for a worldwide XXL big wave award.

Gabe has appeared in numerous television and film productions including presenting Channel 4's 'Surf Trip' with Tess Daly  and BBC 2's Teenage Video Diaries 
On the 16 November 2009 he won 'Best Surfer' at The Quiksilver ‘La Vaca Gigante III’ Big Wave Invitational Event   In February 2011, he won the Wave of the Day Award at Ireland's inaugural big wave invitational event. He currently resides in the North East of England, and is married to author and screenwriter Lauren Davies

References

Living people
Sportspeople from Newcastle upon Tyne
English surfers
Tow-in surfers
Year of birth missing (living people)